Stephen Feldman (born 11 September 1944) is an American academic, and was the third president of Nova Southeastern University. He became the President of Nova Southeastern University in 1992 and was president until 1994. He was president of the Astronaut Memorial Foundation from 1999 to 2012.

Biography
Feldman was President of Western Connecticut State University (1981–1992). (The 3300 seat athletic arena at Western Connecticut State University has been named the Feldman Arena.) He was Vice President of Ethan Allen (furniture company) 1995–1996. He was Vice President of California State University, Long Beach 1996–1999. He was Dean of the Ancell School of Business at Western Connecticut State University 1977–1981. He was Associate Professor of Finance and Chairman of the Department of Banking, Finance and Investments at Hofstra University 1969–1977.

Feldman has served on the Board of Directors for Kane Industries, Science Horizons, Inc., Danbury Hospital, Florida Space Business Roundtable, United Way, and Chambers of Commerce in Connecticut and Florida. He has written numerous articles and has co-authored two books, "Smarter Money" and "The Handbook of Wealth Management." Feldman was also a guest lecturer for two years at the Graduate School of Management at MIT and lectured for twenty years in the IBM Advanced Management School. He is the recipient of the NASA Public Service Medal and served as a member of Governor Jeb Bush's Transition Team.

Feldman was also Chairman of the Board of Directors of the National Space Club, Florida Committee, and Chairman of the Board of Overseers for the Bisk College of Business, Florida Institute of Technology. He served on the Board of Directors for the U.S. Space Walk of Fame Foundation, and was a member of the Executive Committee of the Board of Governors for the Ukleja Center for Ethical Leadership.

Feldman retired as President & CEO of the Astronauts Memorial Foundation on 31 August 2012 after thirteen years as President of the Foundation. The Board of Directors of the Astronauts Memorial Foundation voted to give him the title of President Emeritus in honor of his years of service. He was paid $303,000 annually. This was criticized as being the highest among 100 of Brevard County non-profits. The salary represented 18.3% of the fund's $1.8 million budget in fiscal year 2009. He defended his salary by saying that he was the sole fundraiser and the chief financial officer for the foundation.

References

Living people
Presidents of Nova Southeastern University
1944 births